Goran Sablić (born 4 August 1979) is a Croatian professional football manager and former player.

He spent most of his career in Croatia, playing for Hajduk Split and has also played for Ukrainian side Dynamo Kyiv. Sablić has had two spells as manager of RNK Split, he was once manager of Bosnian Premier League club Široki Brijeg and also managed Moldovan First League club Sheriff Tiraspol. From 2020 until 2021, he was the manager of Hajduk's reserves and youth team. From June until December 2021, Sablić was manager of Sarajevo in the Bosnian Premier League.

Club career
Sablić started his career in Junak Sinj after coming from the club's youth academy. He won the Croatian championship in 2001 and the Croatian Cup in 2000 with Hajduk Split.

He then signed a four-year contract with Dynamo Kyiv on 12 August 2002. With Dynamo Kyiv, Sablić won the Ukrainian Premier League in 2003, 2004 and 2009. He also won the Ukrainian Cup in 2003, 2005 and 2006. After many injury problems, he agreed to go on a loan to reach his previous form. On 30 July 2007, Dynamo Kyiv agreed to loan Sablić to his former club Hajduk for one year. In 2008, he returned to Dynamo and in 2010 he left the club and retired from football.

International career
Sablić made his debut for Croatia in an April 2002 friendly match against Bosnia and Herzegovina, coming on as a 79th-minute substitute for Boris Živković , and earned a total of 5 caps, scoring no goals. His final international was a September 2006 European Championship qualification match away against Russia.

Managerial career

Split
In May 2013, Sablić became the new manager of RNK Split, but after three matches he was sacked. He was once more manager of Split between 2015 and 2016.

Široki Brijeg
During January 2017, Sablić was named the new manager of Bosnian Premier League club Široki Brijeg. In his first season, he guided the club to win the 2016–17 Bosnian Cup. In his second season with Široki, the club finished on 4th place in the 2017–18 Bosnian Premier League and made it to the quarterfinals of the 2017–18 Bosnian Cup where they got eliminated by eventual winners Željezničar. Sablić left the club after the end of the 2017–18 season.

Sheriff Tiraspol
On 7 June 2018, Sablić was appointed manager of Moldovan First League club Sheriff Tiraspol with whom in his first season as manager, won the Moldovan Championship three games before the end of the season. On 27 April 2019, after a 1–0 away league loss against Petrocub Hîncești, he unexpectedly resigned even though Sheriff at the time were on 1st place in the league.

Hajduk Split II
On 15 December 2020, Sablić was announced as the new manager of Hajduk Split II, the Hajduk Split reserves and youth team.

Sarajevo
On 12 June 2021, Sablić became the new manager of Sarajevo, thus returning to manage in the Bosnian Premier League. In his first game as Sarajevo manager, Sablić's team drew against Moldovan club Milsami Orhei in a UEFA Europa Conference League qualifying round on 8 July 2021. His first loss as the club's manager was an unexpected one in the second leg game against Milsami a week later on 15 July, thus knocking out Sarajevo only in the first qualifying round of the Europa Conference League.

Sablić guided the team to his first win as manager in a league game against Posušje on 25 July 2021.

In his first ever Sarajevo derby, Sablić's Sarajevo beat fierce city rivals Željezničar in a league match on 22 September 2021.

On 27 December 2021, he terminated his contract with Sarajevo and left the club, following a half season of very mixed results.

Managerial statistics

Honours

Player
Hajduk Split 
1. HNL: 2000–01
Croatian Cup: 1999–2000

Dynamo Kyiv 
Ukrainian Premier League: 2002–03, 2003–04, 2008–09
Ukrainian Cup: 2002–03, 2004–05, 2005–06
Ukrainian Super Cup: 2004, 2006, 2007, 2009

Manager
Široki Brijeg 
Bosnian Cup: 2016–17

Sheriff Tiraspol 
Moldovan National Division: 2018

References

External links
 

1979 births
Living people
People from Sinj
Association football defenders
Croatian footballers
Croatia youth international footballers
Croatia international footballers
HNK Hajduk Split players
FC Dynamo Kyiv players
Croatian Football League players
Ukrainian Premier League players
Croatian expatriate footballers
Expatriate footballers in Ukraine
Croatian expatriate sportspeople in Ukraine
Croatian football managers
RNK Split managers
NK Široki Brijeg managers
FC Sheriff Tiraspol managers
FK Sarajevo managers
Croatian Football League managers
Premier League of Bosnia and Herzegovina managers
Moldovan Super Liga managers
Croatian expatriate football managers
Expatriate football managers in Bosnia and Herzegovina
Croatian expatriate sportspeople in Bosnia and Herzegovina
Expatriate football managers in Moldova
Croatian expatriate sportspeople in Moldova